Rodrigo Guimarães Santos (born 6 April 1999), commonly known as Rodrigo, is a Brazilian footballer who currently plays as a midfielder for PSTC.

Career statistics

Club

Notes

References

1999 births
Living people
Brazilian footballers
Association football midfielders
Paraná Soccer Technical Center players
União Esporte Clube players